Saint Volusian was the seventh Bishop of Tours, from 491 to 498. He came from a rich and pious senatorial family, and was a close relative of his predecessor Saint Perpetuus, as well as of Ruricius of Limoges. He was deprived of his see by the Visigoths, exiled to Toulouse, and perhaps martyred. His feast day is January 18. He is the patron saint of Foix.

Notes

References
History of the Franks, book X, by Gregory of Tours.

See also
 Saint-Volusien, Foix

External links

 
 Saint Volusien 

Volusianus
Volusianus
Volusianus
Volusianus
5th-century Christian saints
Volusianus